Zhongyuan Tower, also known as Henan Radio and Television Tower or "Tower of Fortune", is located in Zhengzhou, China. It is a multi-functional commercial, artistic and cultural center integrating radio and television broadcasting, tourism, cross-border trade, cultural performance, catering and leisure. It is the world's second tallest steel tower after the Tokyo Skytree.

Design 
It required 22,000 tons of steel; its heaviest component is 40.2 tons. The structure is treated with hot-dip galvanized fluorocarbon paint technology, and the steel component is connected with high-strength bolts. The amount of high-strength bolts is nearly 850,000, and the installation accuracy is 99.98%. It uses high-strength bolt connections, replacing high-altitude welding technology. 

The outer surface is a hyperbolic parabola. From the air, it looks like a plum blossom with five petals. The plum blossom is the provincial flower of Henan province. Five petals are homophonic with "five blessings" in Chinese. Looking up from the ground, the tower is like a static firework that spins upward and flies gracefully. The shape of the tower base is like a tripod, which was a symbol of power and prestige in ancient China. The shape of the tower is like the ancient Chinese musical instrument Chime Bells, which symbolizes the tower's communication function.

Structure and function 
Zhongyuan tower is divided into four parts: tower base, tower body, tower and mast.

The outer wall is decorated with reliefs: Relief 1: Nüwa creates mankind; Relief 2: Hou Yi shot down the sun.

The first floor of the base houses the Henan cross-border trade exhibition and trading center. The second floor is 6.9 meters high, with VIP hall, press conference hall, tourist service center and other supporting facilities. Third and fourth floors of the tower host the largest panoramic painting in the world, "Jinxiu Zhongyuan" (锦绣中原). Ninety-seventh floor of tower has sightseeing service facilities. The revolving restaurant is located there. The 101st floor is 265 meters above the ground level, with a building area of 1,142 square meters and an operating area of 940 square meters, serving the main business projects for high-altitude adventure projects.

History 
In February 2005, the project was approved by the national development and reform commission, PRC.

In April 2006, the preliminary design began.

In November 2006, the design was offered by the architectural design and research institute of Tongji university.

On December 27, 2006, the construction began formally.

In March 2007, construction began.

In October 2009, the tower was completed.

Awards 
The tower received the Zhan Tianyou civil engineering prize from China Civil Engineering Society in March, 2012.

The panorama painting "Jinxiu Zhongyuan" (锦绣中原) in the third and fourth floor center was selected by the Guinness World Records as the largest panoramic painting in the world on April 26, 2011.

Transport
Zhongyuan Tower station

See also
 List of tallest towers in the world
 List of tallest freestanding structures in the world
 List of tallest freestanding steel structures

References

External links

Towers completed in 2011
Observation towers in China
Buildings and structures in Zhengzhou
Communication towers in China
Towers with revolving restaurants
Hyperboloid structures
2011 establishments in China
Mass media in Zhengzhou